Kudakkachira is a small village 9 km away from Palai on Pala-uzhavoor road of Ernakulam - Sabarimala state highway in Kottayam district, Kerala, India. It is part of Meenachil Taluk. The majority of people are Syrian Malabar Nasrani. This region is part of the midlands (adjacent to the highranges) of south-eastern kerala. Main income is from agriculture, mostly rubber plantations.

History
Kudakkachira have a history of many years, initially under the kingdom of Vadakkancoor. In Malayalam year 925, when the King [Marthanda Varma] defeated  vadakkancoor Kudakkachira become part of Kingdom of Travancore. The land earned its name from being gifted to the famous Kudakkachira family.

Economy
 
Majority of people are engaged in rubber cultivation. The land around Kudakkachira is well-suited for cultivation. Rubber, pepper, coconut, paddy, ginger, and turmeric are common items produced here.  The majority of the population belongs to Catholic community.  St. Joseph's Church in Kudakkachira is a famous church and belongs to Pala diocese. There are three Shrines of St.Sebastian, St. Antony and St. Thomas. St.Sebastian's shrine is known as Kudakkachira Kurishupalli. AadhiNarayana temple is situated in this village. This village has a homeo health center, High School- St. Joseph's H.S., Sree Vidyadhiraja CBSE School one cooperative bank (Kudakkachira Service CoOperative Bank), and a branch of State Bank of Travancore(SBT),  and few shops. It belongs to Pala legislative constituency and Kottayam LS constituency.

St Josephs Church

Officiated on 1888, St. Joseph's church is now under Pala diocese. The church was first named after St. George and was later named after St. Joseph. It was once filmed for the film Manasinakkare, a Malayalam movie starring Jayaram, Nayanthara, and the veteran actor Sheela.

Adhi Narayana Temple
Adhi Narayana templeis one of the important Hindu worship place in Kudakkachira, manage by Travancore Devaswom board.

Retreat Center
Divine Mercy Retreat Centre is a Spiritual retreat centre run by Missionaries of Compassion.

Schools
 St.Joseph's School
Under Pala corporate educational agency the educational arm of Pala diocis. This is an aided (government-funded) high school, with classes from 5th to 10th.

St.Joseph's L.P.School
Is aided school under Pala corporate educational agency. And it has got classes starting from 1st standard to 4th standard.

 Vidhyadiraja School
Under Sree Vidyadhiraja educational agency.

Nearest towns
The nearest towns to Marangattupilly are Uzhavoor and Valavoor, and nearest villages are Kurichithanam Chethimattam, and Andoor.

References

Villages in Kottayam district